Docimium, Docimia or Docimeium (Greek:  and ) was an ancient city of Phrygia, Asia Minor where there were famous marble quarries.

History
This city, as appears from its coins – which bear the epigraph  or  – where the inhabitants are called Macedonians, may have been founded by Antigonos Dokimos. The city's name in Greek is Romanized as Dokimeion, Dokimia Kome, Dokimaion, and later Dokimion.

Strabo places Docimium somewhere about Synnada: he calls it a village, and says that there is there a quarry of Synnadic stone, as the Romans call it, but the people of the country call it Docimites and Docimaea; the quarry at first yielded only small pieces of the stone, but owing to the later efforts of the Romans large columns of one piece are taken out, which in variety come near the Alabastrites, so that, though the transport to the sea of such weights is troublesome, still both columns and slabs were brought to Rome of wondrous size and beauty. The red colors which streaked the white marble taken from the city's holy mountain were attributed to the drops of blood from the dying god Attis. The word Docimaea in this passage of Strabo appears to be corrupt.

Strabo says that the plain of Synnada is about 60 stadia long, and beyond it is Docimium. We may, however, infer that he supposed Docimium to be not far from the limit of the plain. The Table makes it 32 M. P. between Synnada and Docimium, and Docimium is on the road from Synnada to Dorylaeum; but the number is certainly erroneous. The exact site of Docimium was a matter of some dispute until recently; it is now fixed at the modern Turkish town İscehisar, in Afyonkarahisar Province.

Episcopal see 
 
On this site have been found many Christian inscriptions, later than Constantine.
 
Docimium was a suffragan of Synnada in Phrygia Salutaris.
 
Six or seven bishops are known, from 344 to 879 (Lequien, Oriens Christianus, I, 853); another bishop is mentioned in an inscription.

Docimium is included in the Catholic Church's list of titular sees.

References

Hellenistic colonies in Anatolia
Ancient Greek archaeological sites in Turkey
Roman towns and cities in Turkey
Catholic titular sees in Asia
Former populated places in Turkey
Geography of Afyonkarahisar Province
History of Afyonkarahisar Province
Tourist attractions in Afyonkarahisar Province
Populated places of the Byzantine Empire
Populated places in Phrygia
Populated places in ancient Galatia
İscehisar District